Notorynchus is a genus of deepwater sharks in the family Hexanchidae. There is one extant species.

Extant species
 Broadnose sevengill shark (Notorynchus cepedianus) Péron, 1807

Extinct species
 Notorynchus borealus Jordan & Hannibal, 1923
 Notorynchus kempi Ward, 1979
 Notorynchus lawleyi Cigala Fulgosi, 1983
 Notorynchus primigenius Agassiz, 1843
 Notorynchus serratissimus Agassiz, 1843
 Notorynchus subrecurvus Oppenheimer, 1907

References

 
Shark genera
Fish genera with one living species